The 2002–03 Weber State Wildcats men's basketball team represented Weber State University during the 2002–03 NCAA Division I men's basketball season. The Wildcats were led by head coach Joe Cravens and played their home games at the Dee Events Center. They were members of the Big Sky Conference. They finished the season 26–6 overall, with a sterling 14–0 mark in Big Sky play to win the conference regular season championship. They were also champions of the Big Sky Conference tournament to earn an automatic bid to the NCAA tournament where they lost in the opening round to Wisconsin.

Roster

Schedule and results

|-
!colspan=9 style=| Regular season

|-
!colspan=9 style=| Big Sky tournament

|-
!colspan=9 style=| NCAA tournament

References

Weber State Wildcats men's basketball seasons
Weber State
Weber State
Weber State Wildcats men's basketball
Weber State Wildcats men's basketball